Sartoria is an unincorporated community in Sartoria Township, Buffalo County, Nebraska, United States.

History
A post office was established at Sartoria in 1886, and remained in operation until it was discontinued in 1924. The name Sartoria was coined by a pioneer settler because he imagined it would be easy for anyone to pronounce.

References

Unincorporated communities in Buffalo County, Nebraska
Unincorporated communities in Nebraska